"On the Floor" is a 2011 song by Jennifer Lopez.

On the Floor may also refer to:

On the Floor, a banking novel by Irish writer Aifric Campbell 
On the Floor, a 2004 album by Adassa and its title track
"On the Floor", a 1984 song by Glenn Jones from Finesse
On the Floor with Fatback, a 1992 album by the Fatback Band
"On the Floor", a 2013 song by IceJJFish